The following is a list of notable people associated with Balliol College, Oxford, including alumni and Masters of the college. When available, year of matriculation is provided in parentheses, as listed in the relevant edition of The Balliol College Register or in the Oxford Dictionary of National Biography. 
Complete (or very nearly complete) lists of Fellows and students, arranged by year of matriculation, can be found in the published Balliol College Register; the 1st edition, 2nd edition and 3rd edition.

This list of notable alumni consists almost entirely of men, because women were admitted to the college only from 1979.

Alumni

Economists

 Lionel Barnett Abrahams (1892)
 W. G. S. Adams
 Sir William Ashley
 Sir William Beveridge
 G. D. H. Cole
 Gavyn Davies (1972)
 Charles Stanton Devas
 Peter Donaldson
 Francis Edgeworth
 Stephanie Flanders
 John Hicks
 Donald MacDougall (1931)
 Patrick Minford
 Michael Posner
 Sir Adam Ridley
 James Robertson (1946)
 Walter Rostow (1936)
 Adam Smith
 Lester Thurow (1960)
 Otto Niemeyer
Deepak Nayyar (1974)

Historians

 Gerald Aylmer
 Timothy Barnes (1960)
 C. A. Bayly
 John Beazley (1903)
 Maxine Berg
 James H. Billington (1950)
 Daniel J. Boorstin (1934)
 Glen Bowersock (1957)
 Denis Brogan

 Manning Clark (1938)
 Peter Calvocoressi (1931)
 Max Crawford
 Donald Creighton
 Fin Crisp
 H. W. C. Davis
 R. H. C. Davis (1937)
 O. M. Edwards
 Geoff Eley
 Charles Harding Firth
 Dominic Sandbrook
 Vivian Hunter Galbraith
 Keith Hancock (1921)
 R. M. Hartwell
 Peter Hayes (1968)
 Christopher Hill (1931)
 Rodney Hilton
 Robert Howard Hodgkin
 John Keegan
 Maurice Keen
 John La Nauze
 Jeremy Lawrance (1971)
 Suzannah Lipscomb (2009)
 George Macdonald
 Arthur Marwick (1957)
 Sir Henry Marten
 Frank McDonough
 H. J. R. Murray (1887)
 Lewis Namier (1908)
 Philip Nord
 Michael Collins Persse
 F. M. Powicke
 Tapan Raychaudhuri (1957)
 H. J. Rose (c.1905)
 Raphael Samuel
 Timothy D. Snyder (1995)
 Richard Southern (1929)
 Hugh Stretton (1946)
 R. H. Tawney (1899)
 Keith Thomas
 Arnold J. Toynbee (1907)
 Bernard Wasserstein
 Patrick Wormald (1966)

Lawyers

 Joel Bakan (Vancouver, BC)
 Henry Bathurst
 Peter Benenson (1939)
 Thomas Bingham (1954)
 Charles Bowen
 Henry Brooke
 George Carman (1949)
 Joseph William Chitty
 John Coleridge
 Thomas Coventry
 Albert Venn Dicey
 Charles Isaac Elton
 John Marshall Harlan II
 Brian Hutton (1950)
 Courtenay Ilbert
 Nicholas Katzenbach (1947)
 Roger Ludlow
 Alan Stewart Orr
 John Popham
 Alan Rodger
 Robert Reed
 Jennifer Robinson (2006)
 William Nimmo Smith
 Mathew Thorpe (1957)
 Theodore Tylor
 Ian Watson (1960)
 Simon Walsh, Barrister and Alderman of the City of London
 William Wickham (1831–1897)

Authors and artists

 Archibald Alison (1775)
 Robert Barnard
 Kyril Bonfiglioli (1955)
 Harold Boulton
 Norman O. Brown (1932)
 Richard Buckle
 W. J. Burley
 Sydney Carter (1933)
 Amit Chaudhuri
 John Churton Collins
 John Stewart Collis
 Cyril Connolly
 David Daiches (1934)
 Rana Dasgupta (1990)
 Robertson Davies (1935)
 Dan Davin (1936)
 Kenneth Dover (1938)
 Robinson Ellis (1852)
 John Evelyn
 Henry Watson Fowler
 Grey Ruthven, 2nd Earl of Gowrie
 Graham Greene (1922)
 Jasper Griffin (1956)
 Stephen Grosz (1952) psychoanalyst and writer
 Inglis Gundry (1923)
 William Hardie (1880)
 L. P. Hartley
 Anthony Hope Hawkins
 Victor Hely-Hutchinson
 Aldous Huxley (1913)
 Julian Huxley
 Nicholas Kenyon (1969)
 Sidney Lee
 John Gibson Lockhart
 Howard Marks (1964)
 Ved Mehta (1956)
 David Binning Monro
 Nicholas Mosley
 John Nichol
 Beverley Nichols
 Anthony Powell (1923)
 Peter Quennell (1923)
 Zia Haider Rahman
 Robert Scott
 Samuel Shem (Stephen Bergman) (1966)
Logan Pearsall Smith (1891)
 Nevil Shute
 Robert Southey
 Olaf Stapledon
 George Steiner (1950)
 Julian Sturgis
 Henry Sweet (1869)
 John Addington Symonds
 Laurence Whistler (1946)
 Miron "Oxxxymiron" Fyodorov (2004)
 Aly Kassam-Remtulla

Mathematicians, scientists and technologists

 George Alberti
 Ewan Birney
 Baruch Blumberg (1957)
 E. J. Bowen
 James Bradley
 Noah Bridges (fl. 1661)
 Benjamin Brodie (1835)
 Richard Dawkins (1959)
 Peter Donnelly
 Atul Gawande (1987)
 David Gregory (1692)
 Graham Higman (1935)
 Robert Hinde (1948)
 Cyril Norman Hinshelwood
 Alex Jadad (1992)
 R. V. Jones (1934)
 Jeremy Knowles (1955)
 Heinrich Gerhard Kuhn (1950)
 Anthony James Leggett (1955)
 Christopher Longuet-Higgins (1941)
 Holbrook Mann MacNeille
 Donald Michie (1945)
 Avrion Mitchison
 Alexander Oppenheim
 Julian Peto
 Alexander George Ogston (1929)
 Henry John Stephen Smith
 Bill Smythies (1931)
 James Stirling
 William Spottiswoode
Herbert Squire
 Gilbert Strang (1955)
 E. C. Titchmarsh (1917)
 J. H. C. Whitehead
 Robin Wilson (1962)
 James Maynard (2009)
 Daniel Adzei Bekoe

Media

 David Aaronovitch
 David Astor
 Stephen Bush
 Vanessa Engle
 Martin Fido
 Maurice Gorham
 Christopher Hitchens
 Henry Vincent Hodson
 John Keegan
 Martin Kettle
 Andrew Knight
 Charles Krauthammer
 Raymond Massey
 Roger Mayne
 Robert Peston
 William Rees-Mogg
 John Schlesinger
 Peter Snow
 Dan Snow
 Peter Usborne
 Hugo Young
 Chadwick Boseman

Other

 Johnny Acton (1989)
 Leonard Barden
 Nick Bevan, rowing coach and headmaster
 Robert Birley
 Cyril George Fox Cartwright
 Herbert Coleridge
 Charles R. Conn
 Arthur Rhys-Davids
 Cressida Dick, commissioner of the London Metropolitan Police and daughter of Balliol Senior Tutor Marcus Dick
 Owen Morgan Edwards
Richard Powell Francis, teacher and first Australian to graduate from Balliol
 John Fulton
 Sir Archibald Philip Hope, 17th Baronet
 Nicola Horlick
 Richard Lambert
 John Aidan Liddell
 Arnold Lunn
 Frederick Septimus Kelly
 Hardit Malik
 Ghislaine Maxwell, socialite and convicted child sex trafficker
 J. Irwin Miller (1931)
 Leif Mills
 William Monson
 Clare Moriarty
 George Ferris Whidborne Mortimer
 Geoff Mulgan
 Mansoor Ali Khan Pataudi
 Raj Patel
 Raaphi Persitz
 Alec Peterson
 Henry Primrose
 Robert Putnam
 John Rennie
 Alan Rotherham (1881)
 Warren Rovetch
 Peter Sedgwick
 Richard Sharp
 Elizabeth Sherwood-Randall
 Leon Simon
 Martin Taylor
 Anthony Teasdale (1975)
 John Templeton
 Henry Hawkins Tremayne (1759)
 Adrian Carton de Wiart, left before graduating to fight in Boer War
 Cecil Jackson-Cole
 Shyamji Krishna Varma

Philosophers and social and political theorists
 Samuel Alexander
 J. L. Austin
 Sir Ernest Barker
 Alfred Barratt
 Roy Bhaskar (1963)
 Bernard Bosanquet
 Edward Caird
 Herman Cappelen (1987)
 Austin Marsden Farrer
 John Niemeyer Findlay
 Kit Fine (1964)
 Paul W. Franks (1983)
 Ernest Gellner (1942)
 Robert Maximilian de Gaynesford (1986)
 Thomas Hill Green
 William Hamilton
 Peter Geach (1934)
 Stuart Hampshire (1933)
 R. M. Hare (1937)
 Katherine Hawley (1989)
 C. E. M. Joad (1910)
 Harold Joachim
 Anthony Kenny (1964)
 John Lucas (1947)
 Steven Lukes
 Stephen Macedo (1980)
 Neil MacCormick
 John Macmurray
 Robert Ranulph Marett
 David Miller (1967)
 Stephen Mulhall
 Richard Lewis Nettleship
 William Newton-Smith (1967)
 Toby Ord
 Herbert James Paton
 Michael Otsuka (1986)
 Derek Parfit (1961)
 David Pears (1946)
 Joseph Raz (1972)
 David George Ritchie
 W. D. Ross
 Ian Rumfitt (1983)
 Alan Ryan (1959)
 Michael Sandel (1975)
 F. C. S. Schiller
 Leon Simon
 Hans Sluga
 John Alexander Smith
 John Tasioulas (1989)
 Charles Taylor (1952)
 Martin Litchfield West
 William Wallace
 Bernard Williams (1947)
 Timothy Williamson (1974)
 John Cook Wilson (1868)
 Richard Wollheim (1941)

Poets

 Matthew Arnold
 Hilaire Belloc
 Henry Charles Beeching
 Andrew Cecil Bradley
 Charles Stuart Calverley
 Sydney Bertram Carter
 Arthur Hugh Clough
 Edward Dyer
 Julian Grenfell
 William Money Hardinge
 Gerard Manley Hopkins
 Andrew Lang
 Walter Lyon
 Francis Turner Palgrave
 F. T. Prince
 Christopher Ricks
 William Young Sellar
 John Campbell Shairp
 Robert Southey (did not graduate)
 Eric Stenbock
 Patrick Shaw-Stewart
 Algernon Charles Swinburne (rusticated 1859)

Politicians

Currently active

Members of Parliament
 Yvette Cooper
 Damian Green
 Helen Hayes
 Boris Johnson (Prime Minister)
 Sir Julian Lewis
 Matthew Pennycook
 Rory Stewart
 Stephen Twigg
 Robin Walker
 Charles Tannock (MEP)

House of Lords
 Alan Beith
 Peter Brooke
 James Douglas-Hamilton
 Jo Johnson
 Roger Freeman
 Robert Maclennan
 Patrick Mayhew
 Ralph Palmer
 Chris Patten
 Dick Taverne

MPs and MEPs who completed service after 2000
 David Faber
 Charlotte Leslie
 Ian Pearson
 James Purnell
 Stephen Twigg
 Kitty Ussher
 Tony Wright
 Louis Grech (MEP, Malta)
 Neil MacCormick (MEP)
 Charles Tannock (MEP)

UK politicians active post-World War II

 John Boyd-Carpenter
 Alex Callinicos
 George Douglas-Hamilton, 10th Earl of Selkirk
 Dingle Foot
 Hugh Fraser
 Ian Gilmour
 Bryan Gould
 Anthony Greenwood
 Jo Grimond
 Denis Healey
 Edward Heath (Prime Minister)
 Stuart Holland
 Christopher Hollis
 David James
 Roy Jenkins
 Toby Jessel
 Hamilton Kerr
 James MacColl
 John Mackintosh
 Crawford Murray MacLehose
 Harold Macmillan (Prime Minister)
 Walter Monckton
 Madron Seligman
 Frank Soskice
 Dick Taverne
 Mike Woodin

UK politicians active between World War I and World War II

 Leo Amery
 H. H. Asquith (Prime Minister)
 George Nathaniel Curzon
 Douglas Douglas-Hamilton, 14th Duke of Hamilton
 R Palme Dutt
 Aubrey Herbert
 Alfred Milner
 Harold Nicolson
 Herbert Samuel
 Arthur Steel-Maitland
 Tom Wintringham (did not graduate)

UK politicians pre-World War I
 Victor Bruce
 Edward Cardwell
 Edward Grey, 1st Viscount Grey of Fallodon
 Stafford Northcote
 Arthur Peel
 Henry Petty-Fitzmaurice
 Robert Reid
 Arnold Sandwith Ward

Politicians, statesmen and monarchs in non-UK countries

 Australia
 Kim Beazley
 Canada
 Bob Rae
 Vincent Massey
 Germany
 Adam von Trott zu Solz
 Richard von Weizsäcker
 Hong Kong SAR
Carson Wen
Kenya
 Wambu Mathu
 Norway
 Harald V
 Olav V
 Malaysia
 Tuanku Jaafar
 Botswana
 Seretse Khama
 Japan
 Masako Owada
 South Africa
 Jan Hofmeyr
 Sri Lanka
 Lakshman Kadirgamar
 United States
 James Burnham
 Christopher Dell
 E. J. Dionne
 Philip Mayer Kaiser
 Matthew Nimetz
 Michael Sandel
 Paul Sarbanes
 George Stephanopoulos

Theologians and clergy

 Mirza Nasir Ahmad
 George Abbot
 John Bell
 Lionel Blue
 Israel Brodie
 Alexander Briant
 Thomas Byles
 John Douglas
 Shoghi Effendi
 Frederick William Faber
 Austin Farrer
 Cardinal Heard
 Ronald Knox
 Cosmo Lang
 Henry Manning
 John Morton
 George Neville
 Henry Oxenham
 John Coleridge Patteson
 Arthur Penrhyn Stanley
 Bill Sykes
 Archibald Campbell Tait
 Frederick Temple
 William Temple
 Godfrey Thring
 Joseph Wood
 John Wycliffe
 Thomas More (suggested but undocumented)

Classical scholars
 John Beazley
 Kenneth Dover
 Richard William Hunt
 Edgar Lobel
 Roger Mynors 
 Russell Meiggs
 Robin Nisbet
 Robert Scott
 William Watt

Fictional
The Rev Francis Arabin (from Barchester Towers)
John Blaylock (from Whitley Streiber's The Hunger)
Captain Hook
Sir Arnold Robinson
Sir Humphrey Appleby
Captain John Charity Spring
Lord Peter Wimsey

Notable applicants who were not matriculated
 Isaiah Berlin
 Daniel Cohn-Bendit
 Tony Blair
 Bill Clinton
 Daniel Dennett
 Colin McGinn
 Lytton Strachey
 A. Hyatt Mayor

Balliol Chancellors of Oxford University
 Richard FitzRalph (1332)
 William de Wilton (1374)
 Thomas Chace (1426)
 Richard Rotherham (1440)
 William Grey (1440)
 Robert Thwaytes (1445)
 George Neville (1453); (1461)
 John Morton (1494)
 George Nathaniel Curzon (1907)
 Alfred Milner (1925)
 Edward Grey (1928)
 Harold Macmillan (1960)
 Roy Harris Jenkins (1987)
 Christopher Francis Patten (2003)

Masters of Balliol

Balliol is run by the Master and Fellows of the college. The Master of the college must be "the person who is, in [the Fellows'] judgement, most fit for the government of the College as a place of religion, learning, and education". The current Master of Balliol is Helen Ghosh.

See also
 List of Balliol College academics

References

Lists of people associated with the University of Oxford